This is a list of 905 species in the genus Phyllophaga, May beetles.

Phyllophaga species

A

 Phyllophaga abcea Saylor, 1940
 Phyllophaga abdominalis (Moser, 1921)
 Phyllophaga abudantuni Chalumeau & Gruner, 1976
 Phyllophaga acacoyahuana Morón & Blas, 2005
 Phyllophaga acapulca Saylor, 1943
 Phyllophaga acatlanensis Morón & Aragon-Garcia, 2012
 Phyllophaga aceitillar Woodruff, 2005
 Phyllophaga acinosa (Arrow, 1920)
 Phyllophaga acunai Chapin, 1937
 Phyllophaga adjuntas Saylor, 1940
 Phyllophaga adoretoides (Von Dalle Torre, 1912)
 Phyllophaga aegrotus (Bates, 1887)
 Phyllophaga aemula (Horn, 1887)
 Phyllophaga aenea (Moser, 1921)
 Phyllophaga aeneotincta Chapin, 1932
 Phyllophaga aequalis (LeConte, 1854)
 Phyllophaga aequata Bates, 1887
 Phyllophaga aequatorialis (Moser, 1921)
 Phyllophaga aeruginosa (Burmeister, 1855)
 Phyllophaga affabilis (Horn, 1887)
 Phyllophaga afflicta (Blanchard, 1851)
 Phyllophaga aguadita (Saylor, 1942)
 Phyllophaga ahlbrandti Garcia-Vidal, 1988
 Phyllophaga alayoi Garcia-Vidal, 1978
 Phyllophaga albina (Burmeister, 1855)
 Phyllophaga alcoa Woodruff, 2005
 Phyllophaga aliada Sanderson, 1951
 Phyllophaga aliciae Morón & Rivera-Cervantes, 2005
 Phyllophaga almada Saylor, 1941
 Phyllophaga alquizara Chapin, 1932
 Phyllophaga alvareztoroi Morón & Blas, 2005
 Phyllophaga amazonica (Moser, 1918)
 Phyllophaga amplicornis (Reinhard, 1939)
 Phyllophaga analis (Burmeister, 1855)
 Phyllophaga andersoni Smith & Paulsen, 2015
 Phyllophaga androw Woodruff, 2005
 Phyllophaga angulicollis (Bates, 1887)
 Phyllophaga angusta (Blanchard, 1851)
 Phyllophaga anolaminata (Moser, 1921)
 Phyllophaga anomaloides (Bates, 1888)
 Phyllophaga antennalis (Moser, 1921)
 Phyllophaga antennata (Smith, 1889)
 Phyllophaga antiguae (Arrow, 1920)
 Phyllophaga anxia (LeConte, 1850)  (cranberry white grub)
 Phyllophaga apicalis (Blanchard, 1851)
 Phyllophaga apicata Reinhard, 1939
 Phyllophaga apolinari Saylor, 1940
 Phyllophaga apolinaria Saylor, 1942
 Phyllophaga approxima Woodruff & Sanderson, 2005
 Phyllophaga aragoni Morón, 2013
 Phyllophaga arcta (Horn, 1887)
 Phyllophaga ardara Saylor, 1943
 Phyllophaga arenicola Howden, 1960
 Phyllophaga arizona Saylor, 1940
 Phyllophaga arkansana (Schaeffer, 1906)
 Phyllophaga arribans Saylor, 1943
 Phyllophaga arrowi Saylor, 1935
 Phyllophaga assmani Saylor, 1936
 Phyllophaga atra (Moser, 1918)
 Phyllophaga atrata (Moser, 1918)
 Phyllophaga atratoides Morón, 2003
 Phyllophaga audanti Wolcott, 1928
 Phyllophaga aurea Luginbill and Painter, 1941
 Phyllophaga austera (Erichson, 1847)
 Phyllophaga avus (Cockerell, 1922)

B

 Phyllophaga babicora Morón, 2004
 Phyllophaga babis Saylor, 1943
 Phyllophaga bahiana (Saylor, 1935)
 Phyllophaga balacachiana Morón, Lugo-García & Aragón-García, 2015
 Phyllophaga balia (Say, 1825)
 Phyllophaga balli Morón & Woodruff, 2008
 Phyllophaga balsana Morón & Aragon-Garcia, 2012
 Phyllophaga baneta Saylor, 1943
 Phyllophaga baoruco Woodruff, 2005
 Phyllophaga baracoana Chapin, 1932
 Phyllophaga baraguensis Chapin, 1932
 Phyllophaga barda (Horn, 1887)
 Phyllophaga baroni (Bates, 1889)
 Phyllophaga barrerana Aragon & Morón, 2003
 Phyllophaga barrosa Sanderson, 1951
 Phyllophaga batillifer (Bates, 1887)
 Phyllophaga beameri Sanderson, 1958
 Phyllophaga beckeri (Moser, 1921)
 Phyllophaga bellamyi Warner and Morón, 1992
 Phyllophaga benexonana Morón, 2000
 Phyllophaga bicavifrons Chapin, 1932
 Phyllophaga bicolor (Moser, 1921)
 Phyllophaga bilobatata Saylor, 1939
 Phyllophaga bilyi Chalumeau, 1989
 Phyllophaga bimaculata Garcia-Vidal, 1984
 Phyllophaga bimammifrons Saylor, 1940
 Phyllophaga bipartita (Horn, 1887)
 Phyllophaga blackwelderi Saylor, 1940
 Phyllophaga blanchardi (Arrow, 1933)
 Phyllophaga blanda Sanderson, 1958
 Phyllophaga bolacoides (Bates, 1887)
 Phyllophaga boliviensis (Blanchard, 1851)
 Phyllophaga bonfils Woodruff & Sanderson, 2005
 Phyllophaga boruca Morón, 2003
 Phyllophaga bottimeri Reinhard, 1950
 Phyllophaga bowditchi Saylor, 1938
 Phyllophaga brama Saylor, 1943
 Phyllophaga bretti Smith & Paulsen, 2015
 Phyllophaga brevicornis Garcia-Vidal, 1988
 Phyllophaga brevidens (Bates, 1888)
 Phyllophaga brevipilosa (Moser, 1918)
 Phyllophaga brownella Saylor, 1942
 Phyllophaga bruneri Chapin, 1932  (Cuban May beetle)
 Phyllophaga buapae Morón, 2013
 Phyllophaga bucephala (Bates, 1887)
 Phyllophaga bueta Saylor, 1940

C

 Phyllophaga caanchaki Morón, 1998
 Phyllophaga cahitana Morón, 2001
 Phyllophaga calai Smith & Paulsen, 2015
 Phyllophaga calceata (LeConte, 1856)
 Phyllophaga calculiventris Saylor, 1935
 Phyllophaga calderasa (Saylor, 1937)
 Phyllophaga callosiventris (Moser, 1921)
 Phyllophaga cambeforti Cartwright & Chalumeau, 1977
 Phyllophaga campana Morón & Riley, 2005
 Phyllophaga caneyensis Garcia-Vidal, 1984
 Phyllophaga canipolea Saylor, 1948
 Phyllophaga canoa Sanderson, 1951
 Phyllophaga canoana Morón, 2003
 Phyllophaga capillata (Blanchard, 1851)
 Phyllophaga caraga Saylor, 1943
 Phyllophaga cardini Chapin, 1932
 Phyllophaga carminator (Horn, 1894)
 Phyllophaga carnegie Woodruff, 2005
 Phyllophaga cartaba Sanderson, 1951
 Phyllophaga castaniella (Bates, 1887)
 Phyllophaga castineirasi Garcia-Vidal, 1978
 Phyllophaga catemacoana Morón, 2003
 Phyllophaga cavata (Bates, 1888)
 Phyllophaga caviceps (Moser, 1918)
 Phyllophaga cayennensis (Moser, 1918)
 Phyllophaga caymanensis Sanderson, 1939
 Phyllophaga cazahuata Morón, 2013
 Phyllophaga cazieriana Saylor, 1938
 Phyllophaga cececpana Morón, 2016
 Phyllophaga centralis (Nonfried, 1894)
 Phyllophaga certanca Saylor, 1943
 Phyllophaga chada Saylor, 1948
 Phyllophaga chalumeaui Garcia-Vidal, 1984
 Phyllophaga chamacayoca Morón, 1992
 Phyllophaga chamula Morón, 1999
 Phyllophaga changuena Morón, 2003
 Phyllophaga chapini Saylor, 1940
 Phyllophaga chiapas Saylor, 1943
 Phyllophaga chiapensis Chapin, 1935
 Phyllophaga chiblacana Morón, 2003
 Phyllophaga chimoxtila Morón, 2003
 Phyllophaga chippewa Saylor, 1939
 Phyllophaga chiriquina (Bates, 1887)
 Phyllophaga chlaenobiana Saylor, 1936
 Phyllophaga choixiana Morón, Lugo-García & Aragón-García, 2015
 Phyllophaga cholana Morón, 2003
 Phyllophaga chortiana Morón, 2003
 Phyllophaga ciliatipes Blanchard, 1850
 Phyllophaga cinnamomea (Blanchard, 1851)
 Phyllophaga citarae Morón & Neita-Moreno, 2014
 Phyllophaga ciudadensis (Bates, 1888)
 Phyllophaga clavijeroi Morón, 2015
 Phyllophaga clemens (Horn, 1887)
 Phyllophaga clypeata (Horn, 1887)
 Phyllophaga cneda Saylor, 1940
 Phyllophaga coahuayana Morón, 2006
 Phyllophaga cochisa Saylor, 1940
 Phyllophaga cocleana Morón, 2013
 Phyllophaga colima Saylor, 1943
 Phyllophaga colimana (Moser, 1921)
 Phyllophaga collaris (Moser, 1921)
 Phyllophaga collaroides Morón, Lugo-García & Aragón-García, 2015
 Phyllophaga columbiana (Blanchard, 1851)
 Phyllophaga comaltepecana Morón, 2003
 Phyllophaga cometes (Bates, 1887)
 Phyllophaga complexipennis Garcia-Vidal, 1984
 Phyllophaga conformis (Blanchard, 1851)
 Phyllophaga congrua (LeConte, 1856)
 Phyllophaga conicariana Morón, 2006
 Phyllophaga contaminata Fall, 1932
 Phyllophaga coronadis Saylor, 1941
 Phyllophaga corrosa (LeConte, 1856)
 Phyllophaga costaricensis (Moser, 1918)
 Phyllophaga costura Sanderson, 1951
 Phyllophaga crassa (Burmeister, 1855)
 Phyllophaga crassissima (Blanchard, 1851)
 Phyllophaga crena Saylor, 1941
 Phyllophaga crenaticollis (Blanchard, 1851)
 Phyllophaga crenonycha Saylor, 1943
 Phyllophaga crenulata (Frölich, 1792)
 Phyllophaga cribrosa (LeConte, 1853)
 Phyllophaga crinipennis (Bates, 1889)
 Phyllophaga crinita (Burmeister, 1855)
 Phyllophaga crinitissima Wolcott, 1924
 Phyllophaga cristagalli (Arrow, 1933)
 Phyllophaga cristobala Saylor, 1942
 Phyllophaga cruces Morón & Riley, 2005
 Phyllophaga cubana Chapin, 1932
 Phyllophaga cuicateca Morón & Aragon, 1997
 Phyllophaga culminata Bates, 1887
 Phyllophaga cupuliformis Langston, 1924
 Phyllophaga curialis Reinhard, 1939
 Phyllophaga cushmani Saylor, 1940
 Phyllophaga cuyabana (Moser, 1918)
 Phyllophaga cylindrica (Burmeister, 1855)

D–F

 Phyllophaga darlingtoni Sanderson, 1940
 Phyllophaga dasypoda (Bates, 1887)
 Phyllophaga davidsoni Woodruff, 2005
 Phyllophaga davisi Langston, 1927
 Phyllophaga debilis (LeConte, 1856)
 Phyllophaga delata (Horn, 1887)
 Phyllophaga deleri Smith & Paulsen, 2015
 Phyllophaga delphinicauda Androw, 2016
 Phyllophaga delplanquei Chalumeau & Gruner, 1976
 Phyllophaga densata (Moser, 1918)
 Phyllophaga densepunctata (Moser, 1918)
 Phyllophaga densicollis (LeConte, 1863)
 Phyllophaga dentex (Bates, 1888)
 Phyllophaga denticulata (Blanchard, 1851)
 Phyllophaga dieteriana Deloya & Morón, 1998
 Phyllophaga diffinis (Blanchard, 1851)
 Phyllophaga diminuta Evans, 2003
 Phyllophaga disca Saylor, 1943
 Phyllophaga discalis Chapin, 1935
 Phyllophaga dispar (Burmeister, 1855)
 Phyllophaga disparilis (Horn, 1878)
 Phyllophaga disrupta Cockerell, 1927
 Phyllophaga dissimilis (Chevrolat, 1865)
 Phyllophaga divertens (Bates, 1888)
 Phyllophaga dominicensis Cartwright & Chalumeau, 1977
 Phyllophaga drakii (Kirby, 1837)
 Phyllophaga dsaimana Morón, 2003
 Phyllophaga dubitata Garcia-Vidal, 1978
 Phyllophaga duenas Saylor, 1941
 Phyllophaga dugesiana Morón & Rivera & Lopez, 2001
 Phyllophaga dulcis (Bates, 1887)
 Phyllophaga duncani (Barrett, 1933)
 Phyllophaga durango Saylor, 1940
 Phyllophaga durangoana (Moser, 1921)
 Phyllophaga durangosa Saylor, 1943
 Phyllophaga ecostata (Horn, 1887)
 Phyllophaga ecuadorae Blackwelder, 1944
 Phyllophaga edrileyi Morón, 2015
 Phyllophaga eladio Woodruff, 2005
 Phyllophaga elegans (Nonfried, 1891)
 Phyllophaga elenans Saylor, 1938
 Phyllophaga eligia Sanderson, 1958
 Phyllophaga elizoria Saylor, 1937
 Phyllophaga elongata (Linell, 1896)
 Phyllophaga emberae Morón, 2015
 Phyllophaga emburyi Saylor, 1938
 Phyllophaga eniba Saylor, 1943
 Phyllophaga ephilida (Say, 1825)
 Phyllophaga epigaea (Wickham, 1903)
 Phyllophaga epulara Sanderson, 1958
 Phyllophaga erota (Saylor, 1942)
 Phyllophaga errans (LeConte, 1860)
 Phyllophaga espina Sanderson, 1951
 Phyllophaga esquinada Sanderson, 1951
 Phyllophaga estacea Saylor, 1943
 Phyllophaga etabatesiana Morón, 1992
 Phyllophaga euryaspis (Bates, 1887)
 Phyllophaga exorata (Horn, 1887)
 Phyllophaga expansa Chapin, 1932
 Phyllophaga explanicollis Chapin, 1935
 Phyllophaga extincta (Wickham, 1916)
 Phyllophaga falcata Smith & Paulsen, 2015
 Phyllophaga falsa (LeConte, 1856)
 Phyllophaga falta (LeConte, 1856)
 Phyllophaga farcta (LeConte, 1856)
 Phyllophaga favosa Saylor, 1941
 Phyllophaga ferrugata (Moser, 1918)
 Phyllophaga ferruginea (Moser, 1918)
 Phyllophaga ferupilis Saylor, 1941
 Phyllophaga fervida (Fabricius, 1775)
 Phyllophaga fesina Saylor, 1948
 Phyllophaga fimbriata Chapin, 1932
 Phyllophaga fimbripes (LeConte, 1856)
 Phyllophaga fissilabris (Bates, 1887)
 Phyllophaga flavidopilosa (Moser, 1921)
 Phyllophaga flavipennis (Horn, 1885)
 Phyllophaga floridana Robinson, 1938
 Phyllophaga foralita Saylor, 1938
 Phyllophaga forbesi Glasgow, 1916
 Phyllophaga forcipata (Burmeister, 1855)
 Phyllophaga forsteri (Burmeister, 1855)
 Phyllophaga fossoria Sanderson, 1951
 Phyllophaga foveicollis (Bates, 1887)
 Phyllophaga foxii Davis, 1920
 Phyllophaga fragilipennis (Blanchard, 1851)
 Phyllophaga franciscana Garcia-Vidal, 1984
 Phyllophaga fraterna Harris, 1842
 Phyllophaga fraternaria Cano & Morón, 2002
 Phyllophaga freeborni Saylor, 1937
 Phyllophaga fucata (Horn, 1887)
 Phyllophaga fulvipennis (Blanchard, 1851)
 Phyllophaga fulviventris (Moser, 1918)
 Phyllophaga fusca (Frölich, 1792)  (northern June beetle)
 Phyllophaga fuscipennis (Moser, 1918)
 Phyllophaga futilis (LeConte, 1850)  (lesser June beetle)

G–I

 Phyllophaga gaigei Sanderson, 1948
 Phyllophaga galeanae Saylor, 1943
 Phyllophaga garrota Sanderson, 1951
 Phyllophaga gastonguzmani Morón, 2016
 Phyllophaga gaumeri (Bates, 1889)
 Phyllophaga gentryi (Saylor, 1936)
 Phyllophaga georgiana (Horn, 1885)
 Phyllophaga ghentata (Saylor, 1937)
 Phyllophaga gigantissima Saylor, 1935
 Phyllophaga ginigra Saylor, 1940
 Phyllophaga glaberrima (Blanchard, 1851)
 Phyllophaga glabricula (LeConte, 1856)
 Phyllophaga gloriae Morón, 2013
 Phyllophaga godwini Morón & Riley, 2005
 Phyllophaga gonzalffteri Morón, 2012
 Phyllophaga gracilis (Burmeister, 1855)
 Phyllophaga gracillima (Von Dalle Torre, 1912)
 Phyllophaga gramma Morón & Woodruff, 2014
 Phyllophaga grancha Saylor, 1948
 Phyllophaga granti Saylor, 1940
 Phyllophaga gravidula (Moser, 1921)
 Phyllophaga grossepunctata (Moser, 1918)
 Phyllophaga guanacasteca Morón & Solis, 2000
 Phyllophaga guanicana Smyth, 1917
 Phyllophaga guapilana Saylor, 1935
 Phyllophaga guapiles Saylor, 1941
 Phyllophaga guapilesea Saylor, 1941
 Phyllophaga guapoloides Morón & Solis, 2001
 Phyllophaga guatemala (Saylor, 1940)
 Phyllophaga guerrocans Saylor, 1938
 Phyllophaga haagi Saylor, 1943
 Phyllophaga haitiensis Woodruff, 2005
 Phyllophaga halffteriana Morón, 1992
 Phyllophaga hamata (Horn, 1887)
 Phyllophaga hardyi Garcia-Vidal, 1984
 Phyllophaga hemilissa (Bates, 1887)
 Phyllophaga herminiae Hernández-Cruz, Morón & Sánchez-García, 2015
 Phyllophaga hernandezi Garcia-Vidal, 1984
 Phyllophaga herrerana Morón, 2017
 Phyllophaga heteroclita (Burmeister, 1855)
 Phyllophaga heteronycha (Bates, 1887)
 Phyllophaga hidalgoana Saylor, 1943
 Phyllophaga hintonella Saylor, 1941
 Phyllophaga hintoni Saylor, 1935
 Phyllophaga hirsuta (Knoch, 1801)
 Phyllophaga hirticollis (Moser, 1921)
 Phyllophaga hirticula (Knoch, 1801)
 Phyllophaga hirtifrons (Moser, 1921)
 Phyllophaga hirtiventris (Horn, 1887)
 Phyllophaga hoegei (Bates, 1887)
 Phyllophaga hoegella Saylor, 1943
 Phyllophaga hoffmanitae Morón, 1996
 Phyllophaga hogardi (Blanchard, 1851)
 Phyllophaga holguinensis Smith & Paulsen, 2015
 Phyllophaga hondura Saylor, 1943
 Phyllophaga hondurasana (Moser, 1921)
 Phyllophaga hoogstraali Saylor, 1943
 Phyllophaga hornii (Smith, 1889)
 Phyllophaga howdeniana Morón, 1992
 Phyllophaga howdenryi Morón & Maes, 2014
 Phyllophaga huachuca Saylor, 1940
 Phyllophaga hubbelli Cartwright, 1946
 Phyllophaga huiteaca Morón, 2006
 Phyllophaga humboldtiana Morón, 2003
 Phyllophaga idonea Sanderson, 1948
 Phyllophaga ignava (Horn, 1887)
 Phyllophaga ilicis (Knoch, 1801)
 Phyllophaga imeldae Morón, 2017
 Phyllophaga imitans Frey, 1975
 Phyllophaga imitatrix Chapin, 1932
 Phyllophaga impar Davis, 1920
 Phyllophaga implicita (Horn, 1887)
 Phyllophaga impressipyga Frey, 1975
 Phyllophaga imprima Sanderson, 1951
 Phyllophaga incuria Sanderson, 1942
 Phyllophaga independentista Garcia-Vidal, 1984
 Phyllophaga inepta (Horn, 1887)
 Phyllophaga infidelis (Horn, 1887)
 Phyllophaga inflativentris (Moser, 1918)
 Phyllophaga inflexa Barrett, 1935
 Phyllophaga instabilis Blackwelder, 1944
 Phyllophaga insulaepinora Garcia-Vidal, 1978
 Phyllophaga insulana (Moser, 1918)
 Phyllophaga insularis Smyth, 1917
 Phyllophaga integra (Say, 1835)
 Phyllophaga integriceps (Moser, 1918)
 Phyllophaga inversa (Horn, 1887)
 Phyllophaga invisa Riley & Wolfe, 1997
 Phyllophaga irazuana Saylor, 1936
 Phyllophaga isabellae Morón & Rivera, 2001
 Phyllophaga itsmica Morón, 2000
 Phyllophaga iviei Chalumeau, 1985
 Phyllophaga izabalana Morón, 2003
 Phyllophaga izucarana Morón & Aragon, 1997

J–L

 Phyllophaga jalisciensis Morón & Rivera & Lopez, 2001
 Phyllophaga jamaicana (Moser, 1918)
 Phyllophaga janzeniana Morón & Solis, 2000
 Phyllophaga jaragua Woodruff, 2005
 Phyllophaga jaronua Chapin, 1932
 Phyllophaga javepacuana Morón, 2003
 Phyllophaga jeanmathieui Morón & Woodruff, 2014
 Phyllophaga jiminezi Woodruff & Sanderson, 2005
 Phyllophaga jorgevaldezi Hernández-Cruz, Morón & Sánchez-García, 2015
 Phyllophaga josepalaciosi Morón & Nogueira, 2012
 Phyllophaga jovelana Morón & Cano, 2000
 Phyllophaga joyana Morón & Rivera & Lopez, 2001
 Phyllophaga jumberea (Saylor, 1942)
 Phyllophaga juquilana Morón, 2000
 Phyllophaga juvenilis (Fall, 1932)
 Phyllophaga karlsioei (Linell, 1898)
 Phyllophaga kayaumariana Morón & Nogueira, 2014
 Phyllophaga kenscoffi Wolcott, 1928
 Phyllophaga kentuckiana Ritcher, 1937
 Phyllophaga knausi (Schaeffer, 1907)
 Phyllophaga knausii (Schaeffer, 1907)
 Phyllophaga knochi (Gyllenhal, 1817)
 Phyllophaga knochii (Schönherr and Gyllenhal, 1817)
 Phyllophaga koehleriana Saylor, 1940
 Phyllophaga kohlmanniana Morón & Solis, 2000
 Phyllophaga kulzeri Frey, 1975
 Phyllophaga kuntzeni (Moser, 1921)
 Phyllophaga laboriosa Garcia-Vidal, 1988
 Phyllophaga labrata Chapin, 1932
 Phyllophaga lacroixi Paulian, 1947
 Phyllophaga laevigata Blanchard, 1851
 Phyllophaga lalanza Saylor, 1941
 Phyllophaga laminata (Moser, 1921)
 Phyllophaga lanata (Blanchard, 1851)
 Phyllophaga lanceolata (Say, 1824)
 Phyllophaga lanepta (Saylor, 1937)
 Phyllophaga laportaei (Blanchard, 1851)
 Phyllophaga laportei Blanchard, 1851
 Phyllophaga larimar Woodruff, 2005
 Phyllophaga latefissa (Moser, 1918)
 Phyllophaga latens (Arrow, 1900)
 Phyllophaga latidens (Schaeffer, 1906)
 Phyllophaga latifrons (LeConte, 1856)
 Phyllophaga latipes Bates, 1887
 Phyllophaga latiungula Wolcott, 1928
 Phyllophaga lebasii (Blanchard, 1851)
 Phyllophaga lempira Morón & Robbins, 2004
 Phyllophaga lenis (Horn, 1887)
 Phyllophaga leonilae Morón, 1995
 Phyllophaga leonina (Bates, 1887)
 Phyllophaga leporina (Erichson, 1848)
 Phyllophaga leprieuri (Blanchard, 1851)
 Phyllophaga leptospica Sanderson, 1951
 Phyllophaga lineata (Bates, 1887)
 Phyllophaga lineatoides Morón, 2000
 Phyllophaga linharesensis Frey, 1975
 Phyllophaga lobata (Fall, 1908)
 Phyllophaga lodingi Sanderson, 1939
 Phyllophaga longicornis (Blanchard, 1851)
 Phyllophaga longifoliata (Moser, 1921)
 Phyllophaga longispina (Smith, 1889)
 Phyllophaga longitarsa (Say, 1824)
 Phyllophaga lorencita Morón & Solis, 2001
 Phyllophaga lota Luginbill, 1928
 Phyllophaga loxichana Morón, 2017
 Phyllophaga luctuosa (Horn, 1887)
 Phyllophaga luginbilli Saylor, 1941
 Phyllophaga lulaana Morón, 2000
 Phyllophaga luridipennis (Moser, 1918)

M

 Phyllophaga macasana (Moser, 1921)
 Phyllophaga macgregori Morón, 2004
 Phyllophaga macmurryi Saylor, 1940
 Phyllophaga macrocera (Bates, 1887)
 Phyllophaga macrophylla (Bates, 1887)
 Phyllophaga maculicollis (LeConte, 1863)
 Phyllophaga maestrensis Garcia-Vidal, 1984
 Phyllophaga magnicornis (Moser, 1921)
 Phyllophaga mali Wolcott, 1928
 Phyllophaga manantleca Morón & Rivera & Lopez, 2001
 Phyllophaga manaosana (Moser, 1924)
 Phyllophaga manchesterea Saylor, 1940
 Phyllophaga mandevillea Saylor, 1940
 Phyllophaga manibota Smith & Paulsen, 2015
 Phyllophaga marcano Woodruff, 2005
 Phyllophaga marcapatana (Moser, 1918)
 Phyllophaga marginalis (LeConte, 1856)
 Phyllophaga mariaegalante Chalumeau & Gruner, 1976
 Phyllophaga mariana Fall, 1929
 Phyllophaga marilucasana Cano & Morón, 2002
 Phyllophaga marina Garcia-Vidal, 1987
 Phyllophaga martiana Saylor, 1943
 Phyllophaga martincampoi Morón & Aragon-Garcia, 2012
 Phyllophaga martinezi Frey, 1975
 Phyllophaga martinezpalaciosi Morón, 1989
 Phyllophaga matacapana Morón, 2003
 Phyllophaga maxima Bates, 1887
 Phyllophaga meadei Saylor, 1940
 Phyllophaga mella Sanderson, 1951
 Phyllophaga menetriesi (Blanchard, 1851)
 Phyllophaga mentalis Saylor, 1941
 Phyllophaga mesophylla Morón & Rivera, 1992
 Phyllophaga mexicana (Blanchard, 1851)
 Phyllophaga micans (Knoch, 1801)
 Phyllophaga michelbacheri Saylor, 1940
 Phyllophaga microcera (Arrow, 1933)
 Phyllophaga microcerus (Arrow, 1933)
 Phyllophaga microchaeta (Moser, 1924)
 Phyllophaga microphylla (Moser, 1918)
 Phyllophaga micros (Bates, 1888)
 Phyllophaga microsoma Chapin, 1932
 Phyllophaga migratoria Garcia-Vidal, 1984
 Phyllophaga mimicana Saylor, 1938
 Phyllophaga minutissima Wolcott, 1928
 Phyllophaga miraflora Saylor, 1940
 Phyllophaga misteca (Bates, 1888)
 Phyllophaga mitlana Saylor, 1943
 Phyllophaga moei Saylor, 1938
 Phyllophaga molopia (Bates, 1888)
 Phyllophaga monana (Moser, 1921)
 Phyllophaga monrosi Frey, 1975
 Phyllophaga monstrosa (Saylor, 1935)
 Phyllophaga montserratensis (Arrow, 1920)
 Phyllophaga morganella Saylor, 1942
 Phyllophaga morgani Saylor, 1938
 Phyllophaga moserella Morón, 2016
 Phyllophaga moseri Frey, 1965
 Phyllophaga mucorea (LeConte, 1856)
 Phyllophaga munizi Morón, 2008
 Phyllophaga murina (Burmeister, 1855)
 Phyllophaga muwieriana Morón & Nogueira, 2014

N–O

 Phyllophaga nahui Morón & Solis, 1994
 Phyllophaga nandalumia Morón & Riley, 2005
 Phyllophaga naranjina Morón & Solis, 2001
 Phyllophaga nasalis Chapin, 1935
 Phyllophaga navassa (Woodruff & Steiner, 2011)
 Phyllophaga navidad Morón & Woodruff, 2008
 Phyllophaga nebulosa Polihronakis, 2007
 Phyllophaga necaxa Saylor, 1943
 Phyllophaga neglecta (Blanchard, 1851)
 Phyllophaga neomexicana Saylor, 1940
 Phyllophaga nepida Saylor, 1941
 Phyllophaga nevermannea Saylor, 1941
 Phyllophaga nevermanni Saylor, 1935
 Phyllophaga nevomeana Morón, 2006
 Phyllophaga nigerrima (Bates, 1887)
 Phyllophaga nigrita (Moser, 1918)
 Phyllophaga nigropicea (Walker, 1866)
 Phyllophaga niquirana Moron, 1990
 Phyllophaga nisuens (Saylor, 1937)
 Phyllophaga nitida (LeConte, 1856)
 Phyllophaga nitidicauda (Arrow, 1913)
 Phyllophaga nitidicollis (Blanchard, 1851)
 Phyllophaga nitididorsis Frey, 1975
 Phyllophaga nogales Saylor, 1940
 Phyllophaga nogueirana Morón, 2002
 Phyllophaga nosa Blackwelder, 1944
 Phyllophaga nubipennis Bates, 1887
 Phyllophaga nuda (Moser, 1918)
 Phyllophaga nudipennis Frey, 1975
 Phyllophaga nunezi Woodruff, 2005
 Phyllophaga oaxaca Saylor, 1940
 Phyllophaga oaxena Saylor, 1940
 Phyllophaga obliquestriata Saylor, 1938
 Phyllophaga oblongula Bates, 1887
 Phyllophaga obsoleta (Blanchard, 1851)
 Phyllophaga ocozocuana Morón, 2003
 Phyllophaga odomi Saylor, 1943
 Phyllophaga ohausi (Moser, 1921)
 Phyllophaga okeechobea Robinson, 1948
 Phyllophaga omani Sanderson, 1937
 Phyllophaga ome Morón, 1991
 Phyllophaga omiltemia Bates, 1889
 Phyllophaga onchophora Chapin, 1932
 Phyllophaga onita Saylor, 1941
 Phyllophaga onoreana Morón, 2003
 Phyllophaga opaca (Moser, 1918)
 Phyllophaga opacicollis (Horn, 1878)
 Phyllophaga orosina (Moser, 1918)
 Phyllophaga ortizi Woodruff, 2005
 Phyllophaga ovalis (Cartwright, 1939)

P

 Phyllophaga pachuca Saylor, 1943
 Phyllophaga pachypyga (Burmeister, 1855)
 Phyllophaga pallida (Horn, 1885)
 Phyllophaga pallidicornis (Moser, 1921)
 Phyllophaga pameana Morón, 2000
 Phyllophaga panamana Chapin, 1935
 Phyllophaga panamensis (Moser, 1921)
 Phyllophaga panicula Sanderson, 1951
 Phyllophaga panorpa Sanderson, 1950
 Phyllophaga papaloana Morón, 2001
 Phyllophaga paraguayana (Moser, 1921)
 Phyllophaga paraguayensis (Moser, 1918)
 Phyllophaga parallela (Blanchard, 1851)
 Phyllophaga parcesetifera Chapin, 1935
 Phyllophaga parilis (Bates, 1888)
 Phyllophaga parumpunctata (Bates, 1887)
 Phyllophaga parvicornis (Moser, 1924)
 Phyllophaga parvidens (LeConte, 1856)
 Phyllophaga parvisetis (Bates, 1887)
 Phyllophaga pastassana (Moser, 1924)
 Phyllophaga paternoi Glasgow, 1925
 Phyllophaga patruelis (Chevrolat, 1865)
 Phyllophaga patrueloides Paulian, 1947
 Phyllophaga pauliani Chalumeau & Gruner, 1976
 Phyllophaga pauloensis Frey, 1975
 Phyllophaga pearliae Davis, 1920
 Phyllophaga peccata Blackwelder, 1944
 Phyllophaga pectoralis (Blanchard, 1851)
 Phyllophaga pedernales Woodruff, 2005
 Phyllophaga penaella Frey, 1975
 Phyllophaga peninsulana (Moser, 1918)
 Phyllophaga peninsularis Saylor, 1940
 Phyllophaga pentaphylla (Bates, 1888)
 Phyllophaga perfidia Smith & Paulsen, 2015
 Phyllophaga perlonga Davis, 1920
 Phyllophaga permagna (Moser, 1918)
 Phyllophaga persimilis Chapin, 1935
 Phyllophaga personata Chapin, 1935
 Phyllophaga peruana (Moser, 1918)
 Phyllophaga picadoana Morón & Solis, 2000
 Phyllophaga picea (Blanchard, 1851)
 Phyllophaga piceola (Bates, 1887)
 Phyllophaga picipennis (Moser, 1918)
 Phyllophaga piligera (Moser, 1918)
 Phyllophaga piliventris (Moser, 1918)
 Phyllophaga pilosipes Saylor, 1940
 Phyllophaga pilositarsis Blackwelder, 1944
 Phyllophaga pilosula (Moser, 1918)
 Phyllophaga pilotoensis Garcia-Vidal, 1987
 Phyllophaga pilula (Moser, 1921)
 Phyllophaga pinophilus Morón & Woodruff, 2014
 Phyllophaga plaei (Blanchard, 1851)
 Phyllophaga plairi (Saylor, 1937)
 Phyllophaga planeta Reinhard, 1950
 Phyllophaga platti Saylor, 1935
 Phyllophaga platyrhina (Bates, 1887)
 Phyllophaga plena (Fall, 1932)
 Phyllophaga pleroma Reinhard, 1940
 Phyllophaga poculifer (Bates, 1887)
 Phyllophaga pokornyiana Morón, 1995
 Phyllophaga polita (Harold, 1869)
 Phyllophaga polyphylla (Bates, 1887)
 Phyllophaga postrema (Horn, 1887)
 Phyllophaga poterillosa Saylor, 1942
 Phyllophaga potosisalta Morón & Woodruff, 2008
 Phyllophaga potrerillo Garcia-Vidal, 1987
 Phyllophaga praesidii (Bates, 1888)
 Phyllophaga praetermissa (Horn, 1887)
 Phyllophaga probaporra Sanderson, 1951
 Phyllophaga profunda (Blanchard, 1851)
 Phyllophaga prolixa (Bates, 1887)
 Phyllophaga propinqua (Moser, 1918)
 Phyllophaga pruinipennis (Moser, 1918)
 Phyllophaga pruinosa (Blanchard, 1851)
 Phyllophaga prunina (LeConte, 1856)
 Phyllophaga prununculina (Burmeister, 1855)
 Phyllophaga pseudoatra Morón, 2003
 Phyllophaga pseudocalcaris Saylor, 1940
 Phyllophaga pseudocarus Morón, 1999
 Phyllophaga pseudofloridana Woodruff and Beck, 1989
 Phyllophaga pseudomicans Chapin, 1935
 Phyllophaga psiloptera Sanderson, 1939
 Phyllophaga puberea (Mannerheim, 1829)
 Phyllophaga puberula (Jacquelin Du Val, 1856)
 Phyllophaga pubescens (Burmeister, 1855)
 Phyllophaga pubicauda (Bates, 1887)
 Phyllophaga pubicollis (Blanchard, 1851)
 Phyllophaga pudorosa Reinhard, 1939
 Phyllophaga puerilis Wickham, 1914
 Phyllophaga pulcher (Linell, 1896)
 Phyllophaga punctipennis (Blanchard, 1851)
 Phyllophaga punctulata (Blanchard, 1851)
 Phyllophaga punctuliceps Bates, 1887
 Phyllophaga punctulicollis (Bates, 1887)
 Phyllophaga puntarenosa Morón & Solis, 2001
 Phyllophaga pusillidens Fall, 1937

Q–R

 Phyllophaga quadriphylla Saylor, 1943
 Phyllophaga querca (Knoch, 1801)
 Phyllophaga quercus (Knoch, 1801)
 Phyllophaga quetzala Morón, 2001
 Phyllophaga quetzaloides Morón, 2001
 Phyllophaga quetzalpoa Morón, 2015
 Phyllophaga quiana Morón, 2003
 Phyllophaga quituana Morón, 2015
 Phyllophaga rafaelamothei Morón, 2016
 Phyllophaga rangelana Chapin, 1935
 Phyllophaga ratcliffeiana Morón, 1992
 Phyllophaga ravida (Blanchard, 1851)
 Phyllophaga rawlinsi Woodruff, 2005
 Phyllophaga raydoma (Saylor, 1943)
 Phyllophaga recorta Sanderson, 1951
 Phyllophaga reevesi Saylor, 1939
 Phyllophaga regiomontana Morón, 2001
 Phyllophaga reinhardi Saylor, 1940
 Phyllophaga renodis Reinhard, 1939
 Phyllophaga reticulata Frey, 1975
 Phyllophaga reventazona Saylor, 1936
 Phyllophaga rex Woodruff & Sanderson, 2005
 Phyllophaga reyescastilloi Morón, 2013
 Phyllophaga reyesiana Morón, 1992
 Phyllophaga reyesolivasi Morón, Lugo-García & Aragón-García, 2015
 Phyllophaga riverana Morón, 2004
 Phyllophaga riviera Reinhard, 1950
 Phyllophaga roberterroni Morón, 2017
 Phyllophaga rodriguezi Bates, 1889
 Phyllophaga rolbakeri Saylor, 1940
 Phyllophaga rolstoni Riley & Wolfe, 1997
 Phyllophaga romana Saylor, 1946
 Phyllophaga rorida (Burmeister, 1855)
 Phyllophaga rorulenta (Burmeister, 1855)
 Phyllophaga roscida (Burmeister, 1855)
 Phyllophaga rossi Saylor, 1939
 Phyllophaga rostrypyga (Bates, 1888)
 Phyllophaga rubiginosa (LeConte, 1856)
 Phyllophaga rubricosa Reinhard, 1939
 Phyllophaga ruficollis (Moser, 1915)
 Phyllophaga rufipes (Moser, 1924)
 Phyllophaga rufithorax (Moser, 1921)
 Phyllophaga rufiventris (Kirsch, 1885)
 Phyllophaga rufotestacea (Moser, 1918)
 Phyllophaga rugicollis (Bates, 1887)
 Phyllophaga rugipennis (Schaufuss, 1858)
 Phyllophaga rugithorax Saylor, 1938
 Phyllophaga rugosa (Melsheimer, 1845)  (rugose June beetle)
 Phyllophaga rugulosa (Blanchard, 1851)
 Phyllophaga rustica Woodruff, 2005
 Phyllophaga rzedowskiana Aragon & Morón, 2003

S

 Phyllophaga sacoma Reinhard, 1939
 Phyllophaga saginata (Mannerheim, 1829)
 Phyllophaga sahagundinoi Morón, 2015
 Phyllophaga saltana Frey, 1975
 Phyllophaga sanbarthensis Chalumeau & Gruner, 1976
 Phyllophaga sanctipauli (Blanchard, 1851)
 Phyllophaga sandersoni Garcia-Vidal, 1988
 Phyllophaga sandersoniana Morón, 1992
 Phyllophaga sandersoniella Chalumeau & Gruner, 1976
 Phyllophaga santachloe Woodruff, 2005
 Phyllophaga santaclarae Chapin, 1932
 Phyllophaga santiagozai Morón, 2011
 Phyllophaga santiaguensis Garcia-Vidal, 1987
 Phyllophaga sarlacca Smith & Paulsen, 2015
 Phyllophaga saylori Sanderson, 1965
 Phyllophaga sayloriana Morón & Rivera & Lopez, 2001
 Phyllophaga scabrifrons (Bates, 1887)
 Phyllophaga scabripyga Bates, 1887
 Phyllophaga scaramuzzai Garcia-Vidal, 1988
 Phyllophaga schaefferi Saylor, 1937
 Phyllophaga schenklingi Moser, 1918
 Phyllophaga schizorhina (Bates, 1887)
 Phyllophaga schizorhinoides Morón, 2003
 Phyllophaga schneblei Frey, 1975
 Phyllophaga schusteriana (Cano & Morón, 2002)
 Phyllophaga schwarzi Chapin, 1932
 Phyllophaga scissa (Bates, 1887)
 Phyllophaga scitula (Horn, 1887)
 Phyllophaga scoparia (LeConte, 1856)
 Phyllophaga scuticeps (Bates, 1888)
 Phyllophaga secessicola Smith & Paulsen, 2015
 Phyllophaga segregans (Bates, 1888)
 Phyllophaga senex (Horn, 1878)
 Phyllophaga senicula (Bates, 1887)
 Phyllophaga sequoiana Saylor, 1936
 Phyllophaga sericata (Erichson, 1848)
 Phyllophaga serrana Morón & Cano, 2000
 Phyllophaga serratipes Morón & Cano, 2000
 Phyllophaga setifera (Burmeister, 1855)
 Phyllophaga sibonyensis Garcia-Vidal, 1988
 Phyllophaga signaticollis (Burmeister, 1855)
 Phyllophaga sinaloana Saylor, 1935
 Phyllophaga sinicollis Saylor, 1943
 Phyllophaga sinuaticeps (Moser, 1921)
 Phyllophaga skelleyi Woodruff and Beck, 1989
 Phyllophaga smithi (Arrow, 1912)
 Phyllophaga snowi Saylor, 1940
 Phyllophaga sociata (Horn, 1878)
 Phyllophaga sodalis Reinhard, 1940
 Phyllophaga sodialis Reinhard, 1940
 Phyllophaga solanophaga Morón, 1988
 Phyllophaga solavegana Morón, 2000
 Phyllophaga solisiana Morón, 2003
 Phyllophaga sonora Saylor, 1939
 Phyllophaga soror Davis, 1920
 Phyllophaga spaethi (Nonfried, 1891)
 Phyllophaga speculifera (Chevrolat, 1865)
 Phyllophaga spinicola Garcia-Vidal, 1984
 Phyllophaga spinifemora Saylor, 1940
 Phyllophaga spinitarsis (Moser, 1921)
 Phyllophaga spreta (Horn, 1887)
 Phyllophaga squamifera Frey, 1976
 Phyllophaga squamipilosa Saylor, 1937
 Phyllophaga stehlei Chalumeau, 1985
 Phyllophaga stipitalis (Blanchard, 1851)
 Phyllophaga stohleri Saylor, 1938
 Phyllophaga straminea (Bates, 1887)
 Phyllophaga sturmi (Bates, 1887)
 Phyllophaga stzotzilana Morón, 2001
 Phyllophaga submetallica (Bates, 1887)
 Phyllophaga submucida (LeConte, 1856)
 Phyllophaga subnitida (Moser, 1918)
 Phyllophaga subopaca (Moser, 1918)
 Phyllophaga subpruinosa (Casey, 1884)
 Phyllophaga subrugosa (Moser, 1924)
 Phyllophaga subspinosa (Harris, 1826)
 Phyllophaga subtonsa (LeConte, 1856)
 Phyllophaga suriana Morón, 2002
 Phyllophaga suttonana Reinhard, 1939
 Phyllophaga suturalis (Chevrolat, 1865)
 Phyllophaga sylvatica Sanderson, 1942

T

 Phyllophaga tajimaroana Morón, 2000
 Phyllophaga talamancana Morón & Solis, 2001
 Phyllophaga tamatziana Morón & Nogueira, 2014
 Phyllophaga tancitara Saylor, 1943
 Phyllophaga tapantina Morón & Solis, 2001
 Phyllophaga tarsalis (Schaeffer, 1908)
 Phyllophaga tascatensis Morón, Lugo-García & Aragón-García, 2015
 Phyllophaga taxodii Langston, 1924
 Phyllophaga tecta Cartwright, 1944
 Phyllophaga tegenara Saylor, 1935
 Phyllophaga tegulicollis Saylor, 1934
 Phyllophaga tejupana Morón, 2000
 Phyllophaga tejupilcas Saylor, 1943
 Phyllophaga temascalis Saylor, 1941
 Phyllophaga temascaltepeca Saylor, 1934
 Phyllophaga temaxa Saylor, 1940
 Phyllophaga temora Saylor, 1943
 Phyllophaga tenuipilis (Bates, 1887)
 Phyllophaga teosinteophaga Morón & Rivera, 1992
 Phyllophaga tepanana Saylor, 1938
 Phyllophaga tepequetzala Morón, 2015
 Phyllophaga terezinae Frey, 1965
 Phyllophaga terminalis Saylor, 1935
 Phyllophaga tesorito Vallejo & Wolff, 2013
 Phyllophaga tetracera Chapin, 1932
 Phyllophaga tetraphylla (Moser, 1918)
 Phyllophaga texensis Saylor, 1940
 Phyllophaga thoracica (Burmeister, 1855)
 Phyllophaga tilarana Morón & Solis, 2001
 Phyllophaga timida (Horn, 1878)
 Phyllophaga tlamana Morón, 2016
 Phyllophaga tlanchinolensis Morón, 2000
 Phyllophaga tojolabala Morón, 1999
 Phyllophaga toni Woodruff, 2005
 Phyllophaga torta (LeConte, 1856)
 Phyllophaga totonis Saylor, 1941
 Phyllophaga totoreana Morón, 2006
 Phyllophaga trichoderma (Moser, 1921)
 Phyllophaga trichodes (Bates, 1890)
 Phyllophaga tridens (Bates, 1887)
 Phyllophaga tridilonycha Saylor, 1943
 Phyllophaga trinitariensis Garcia-Vidal, 1987
 Phyllophaga tristis (Fabricius, 1781)
 Phyllophaga triticophaga Morón & Salvadori, 1998
 Phyllophaga trochanter Saylor, 1940
 Phyllophaga tsajumiana Morón, 2001
 Phyllophaga tuberculifrons (Chevrolat, 1865)
 Phyllophaga tumulosa Bates, 1887
 Phyllophaga tusa (Horn, 1887)
 Phyllophaga tuxtleca Morón, 2003
 Phyllophaga tzintzontliana Morón, 1992

U–Z

 Phyllophaga ueiacayoca Morón, 1992
 Phyllophaga ulkei (Smith, 1889)
 Phyllophaga umbrosa (Erichson, 1847)
 Phyllophaga uniformis (Blanchard, 1851)
 Phyllophaga uruguayana (Saylor, 1935)
 Phyllophaga valeriana Saylor, 1934
 Phyllophaga valia Saylor, 1940
 Phyllophaga vallendensis Morón, 2013
 Phyllophaga vandinei Smyth, 1917
 Phyllophaga vandykei Saylor, 1935
 Phyllophaga varohiana Morón, 2006
 Phyllophaga vazquezae Morón, 1995
 Phyllophaga vehemens (Horn, 1887)
 Phyllophaga velezangeli Morón & Neita-Moreno, 2014
 Phyllophaga venodiola Saylor, 1948
 Phyllophaga vermiculata Chapin, 1932
 Phyllophaga verruciventris (Moser, 1918)
 Phyllophaga vestita (Moser, 1918)
 Phyllophaga vetula (Horn, 1887)
 Phyllophaga vexata (Horn, 1885)
 Phyllophaga vicina (Moser, 1918)
 Phyllophaga vilifrons (LeConte, 1856)
 Phyllophaga villaclarensis Garcia-Vidal, 1987
 Phyllophaga villardoi Morón & Ordóñez-Reséndiz, 2015
 Phyllophaga villifrons (LeConte, 1856)
 Phyllophaga violetae Morón & Aragon-Garcia, 2012
 Phyllophaga vulpes (Arrow, 1913)
 Phyllophaga wickhami Saylor, 1940
 Phyllophaga wittkugeli (Nonfried, 1891)
 Phyllophaga wolcotti Saylor, 1940
 Phyllophaga xalacoatepecana Morón, 2015
 Phyllophaga xanthe (Bates, 1888)
 Phyllophaga xanthocoma (Bates, 1887)
 Phyllophaga xerophila Saylor, 1939
 Phyllophaga xkumuka Morón, 1999
 Phyllophaga yaqui Saylor, 1940
 Phyllophaga yaxbitana Morón, 2000
 Phyllophaga yei Morón, 1991
 Phyllophaga yemasseei Cartwright, 1944
 Phyllophaga yoloxana Morón, 2003
 Phyllophaga youngi Cartwright, 1935
 Phyllophaga yucana Saylor, 1937
 Phyllophaga yunqueana Chapin, 1935
 Phyllophaga zacaquetzala Morón, 2015
 Phyllophaga zaragozana Morón, 2003
 Phyllophaga zarcoana Morón, 2003
 Phyllophaga zavalana Reinhard, 1946
 Phyllophaga zayasi Garcia-Vidal, 1978
 Phyllophaga zeteki Saylor, 1942
 Phyllophaga zunilensis Bates, 1887
 Phyllophaga zunimarioi Morón & Maes, 2014

References

Phyllophaga